Tepehua is a language cluster of Mexico, spoken across a number of central Mexican states by the Tepehua people. Tepehua is a Mesoamerican language and shows many of the traits which define the Mesoamerican Linguistic Area. Along with some 62 other indigenous languages, it is recognized by a statutory law of Mexico (General Law of Linguistic Rights of the Indigenous Peoples) as an official language in the Mexican Federal District and the other administrative divisions in which it is spoken and it is on an equal footing with Spanish.

Huehuetla and Pisaflores are at best marginally intelligible, at 60–70% intelligibility (depending on direction). Tlachichilco has much lower intelligibility with the others, at 40% intelligibility or less.

Morphology
Tepehua is an agglutinative language, where words use suffix complexes for a variety of purposes with several morphemes strung together.

References

Agglutinative languages
Totonacan languages

Languages of Mexico